Licornia is a genus of gymnolaematan bryozoans (sea mats).

Species 

 Licornia annectens (MacGillivray, 1887)
 Licornia bifurcata (Liu, 2001)
 Licornia cervicornis (Busk, 1852)
 Licornia curvata (Harmer, 1926)
 Licornia cyclostoma (Busk, 1852)
 Licornia diadema (Busk, 1852)
 Licornia diegensis (Robertson, 1905)
 Licornia drachi (Marcus, 1955)
 Licornia ferox (Busk, 1852)
 Licornia gaspari (Thornely, 1907)
 Licornia jolloisii (Audouin, 1826)
 Licornia longispinosa (Harmer, 1926)
 Licornia macropora (Osburn, 1950)
 Licornia mexicana (Osburn, 1950)
 Licornia micheli (Marcus, 1955)
 Licornia peltata (Tilbrook & Vieira, 2012)
 Licornia prolata (Tilbrook & Vieira, 2012)
 Licornia pugnax (Osburn, 1950)
 Licornia regularis (Osburn, 1940)
 Licornia securifera (Busk, 1884)
 Licornia spinigera (Osburn, 1950)
 Licornia tridentata (Waters, 1918)
 Licornia vieirai Sokolover, Taylor & Ilan, 2016
 Licornia wasinensis (Waters, 1913)

References

Further reading
Badve, R. M., and M. A. Sonar. "Some fossil neocheilostomine bryozoans from the Holocene of the west coast of Maharashtra and Goa, India." Jour. Palaeontol. Soc. India 42 (1997): 35-48.
GORDON, Dennis. "Bryozoa of New Caledonia." Compendium of marine species of New Caledonia. Documents scientifiques et techniques (2006): 157-168.
Vieira, Leandro M., et al. "Evidence for polyphyly of the genus Scrupocellaria (Bryozoa: Candidae) based on a phylogenetic analysis of morphological characters." PLoS ONE 9.4 (2014): e95296.
Vieira, Leandro M., et al. "Evidence for polyphyly of the genus Scrupocellaria (Bryozoa: Candidae) based on a phylogenetic analysis of morphological characters." PLoS ONE 9.4 (2014): e95296.

Animals described in 1850
Cheilostomatida
Bryozoan genera